Bailey Marie De Young (née Buntain; September 16, 1989) is an American actress. She is known for playing Ginny Thompson on Bunheads, Lauren Cooper on Faking It, and Imogene Cleary on The Marvelous Mrs. Maisel.

Career 
De Young is a native of Sacramento, California. She began studying dancing around the age of seven, with a focus in jazz, tap and ballet. She is also a trained soprano, with various theater credits. After graduating from the American Musical and Dramatic Academy, she won the leading role of Ginny Thompson on the ABC Family series Bunheads. In 2014, she made a guest appearance on the sitcom Baby Daddy as Bailey, and Jenna Taylor on The Middle. In 2014, she was cast in the MTV sitcom Faking It as Lauren. She then went on to play Imogene Cleary on the Amazon Prime series The Marvelous Mrs. Maisel.

Personal life 
She and musician Tyler De Young were married on August 3, 2014. They had their first child, a daughter, in September 2018.
In July 2020, their second child, a boy, was born. In December 2021, she announced they were expecting their third child, another boy, who was born in May 2022.

Filmography

References

External links 

 
 Bailey De Young at MTV

Actresses from Sacramento, California
American ballerinas
American television actresses
Living people
1989 births
21st-century American actresses
Musicians from Sacramento, California
American Musical and Dramatic Academy alumni